The Atlanta, Birmingham and Coast Railroad was organized in 1926 to replace the Atlanta, Birmingham and Atlantic Railway. The AB&C was controlled by the Atlantic Coast Line Railroad, which owned a majority of the stock. In 1944 it reported 763 million net ton-miles of revenue freight and 33 million passenger-miles; at the end of that year it operated 639 miles of road and 836 miles of track.

Passenger services
It had day and night services on its transit to Atlanta, starting at Terminal Station, Cordele and Waycross division. A branch from that division, breaking off at Fitzgerald, carried sleeping cars from Atlanta to Thomasville. It had an overnight night train from Birmingham, Alabama (the ABC's own Eleventh Street station) continued to Manchester, Georgia, Fitzgerald, Thomasville, Waycross and Brunswick. Another division carried trains from Atlanta to Brunswick.

Acquisition
In 1946 the AB&C was bought by the ACL and then became the latter company's Western Division.

References 

 Atlanta, Birmingham and Coast Railroad - report by Georgia Department of Transportation, 2018; 54 pp.
 Georgia Railroads, History and Heritage
 Goolsby, Larry Atlantic, Birmingham & Coast. ACL&SAL Historical Society. 2000.

Defunct Georgia (U.S. state) railroads
Former Class I railroads in the United States
Predecessors of the Atlantic Coast Line Railroad
Railway companies established in 1926
Railway companies disestablished in 1946
Defunct Alabama railroads
American companies established in 1926
1946 mergers and acquisitions
1926 establishments in Georgia (U.S. state)
1946 disestablishments in Georgia (U.S. state)
American companies disestablished in 1946